Frédéric Soulié (23 December 1800 – 23 September 1847) was a French popular novelist and playwright.  He wrote over forty sensation novels like Mémoires du diable (1837-8).

Life
Frédéric Soulié was born in Foix, the son of a philosopher professor. He gained a law degree before going to Paris to pursue a literary life. Though his early historical dramas were unsuccessful, he gained more attention with the novel Les deux cadavres (1832).

Works

Plays
 Roméo et Juliette, 1828.
 Christine à Fontainebleau, 1829.
 Clotilde, 1832.
 Diane de Chivri, 1839
 Le fils de la folle
 Le Proscrit, 1840
 La Closerie des Genêts, 1846.

Novels
 Les deux cadavres [The two corpses], 1832.
 Le vicomte de Béziers, 1834.
 Le comte de Toulouse, 1835.
 Les mémoires du diable [Memoirs of the devil], 1837-8. (translated into English by Black Coat Press in 2 volumes)
 Les prétendus [The pretenders], 1842.
 La lionne [The lion], 1846
 La comtesse de Monrion, 1847
 Confession générale
 Eulalie Pons
 La Comtesse de Mourion
 Saturnin Fichet

References

External links
 

1800 births
1847 deaths
People from Foix
19th-century French dramatists and playwrights
Burials at Père Lachaise Cemetery
19th-century French novelists
French male novelists
19th-century French male writers